Alfred Knight may refer to:

 Alfred Joseph Knight (1888–1960), English recipient of the Victoria Cross
 Alfred Knight (weightlifter) (born 1916), British weightlifter